James Douglas Howard-Johnston (born 12 March 1942), is an English historian of the Byzantine Empire. He was University Lecturer in Byzantine Studies at the University of Oxford. He is an emeritus fellow of Corpus Christi College, Oxford. His approach on Byzantium follows that of Edward Gibbon and concentrates on comparisons between the Byzantine state and its Western counterparts. Also, Howard-Johnston has done much research on Late Antiquity, especially the Roman-Persian Wars and the Coming of Islam.

Career
Howard-Johnston was Junior Research Lecturer at Christ Church, Oxford, from 1966 to 1971, during which he also held a Junior Fellowship at Dumbarton Oaks (1968-9). Later, he was University Lecturer in Byzantine Studies and Fellow of Corpus Christi College, Oxford, until his retirement in 2009. He was briefly interim President of the same college in the mid-2000s.

Politics 
He was a member of Oxford City Council (1971-6) and Oxfordshire County Council (1973-7, 1981-7).

Alexiad authorship 
In 1989 Howard-Johnston asserted that The Alexiad of Anna Komnene could not have been written by a "Constantinople-bound princess" and that "the detailed and conversant campaign narratives of the Alexiad can only have been constructed by a 'latterday [sic] Procopius' or retired soldier."

Personal life 
He is married to the novelist Angela Huth and has a step-daughter and daughter.

Bibliography
 The Last Great War of Antiquity. (2020)
 Witnesses to a World Crisis: Historians and Histories of the Middle East in the Seventh Century. (2010)
 The Cult of Saints in Late Antiquity and the Middle Ages: Essays on the contribution of Peter Brown. (1999)
 The Scholar & the Gypsy: Two Journeys to Turkey – Past and Present. (1992)
 Studies in the Organization of the Byzantine Army in the Tenth and Eleventh Centuries. (1971)

References

English historians
Living people
British Byzantinists
1942 births
English male non-fiction writers
Scholars of Byzantine history